Herrmannsacker is a village and a former municipality in the district of Nordhausen, in Thuringia, Germany. Since July 2018, it is part of the municipality Harztor.

References

Former municipalities in Thuringia
Villages in the Harz
Nordhausen (district)